The 1939–40 British Ice Hockey season featured the English National League and Scottish National League.

English National League

Scottish National League

Points Competition
Scores

Table

Regular season
Scores

Table

Scottish Ice Hockey League Championship
The winners of the Points Competition (Perth) and the Regular Season (Fife) met to decide the League Championship.
Fife Flyers - Perth Panthers 4:4, 4:3, 5:4 - was originally going to be a five-game series, cut to three

Scottish Cup

Results
First round
Dunfermline Vikings - Fife Flyers 9:5 on aggregate (3:1, 6:4)
Falkirk Lions - Ayr Raiders 6:7 on aggregate (3:1, 3:6)
Dundee Tigers - Perth Panthers (5:3, 6:7 - Perth won in OT)
Second round
Two losers from the first round played in this series to decide the fourth team in the semifinals.
Falkirk Lions - Dundee Tigers 10:8 on aggregate (5:4, 5:4)
Semifinals
Dunfermline Vikings - Ayr Raiders 10:5 on aggregate (3:1, 7:4)
Falkirk Lions - Perth Panthers 7:4 on aggregate (3:3, 4:1)
Final
Dunfermline Vikings - Falkirk Lions 10:10 on aggregate (5:5, 5:5)
Final replay
As the teams were even on goals, the final series was replayed.
Dunfermline Vikings - Falkirk Lions 7:6 on aggregate (3:3, 4:3)

Simpson Trophy

Results
First round
Ayr Raiders - Dunfermline Vikings 10:8 on aggregate (5:3, 5:5) 
Dundee Tigers - Fife Flyers 10:7 on aggregate (6:2, 4:5) 
Perth Panthers - Falkirk Lions 8:8 on aggregate (4:6, 4:2)
Semifinals
Perth Panthers - Ayr Raiders 8:4 on aggregate (4:2, 4:2) 
Dundee Tigers - Falkirk Lions 6:3 on aggregate (6:2, 0:1) 
Final
Perth Panthers - Dundee Tigers 12:5 on aggregate (7:4, 5:1)

Coronation Cup

Results
First round
12/10: Falkirk Lions - Glasgow Mohawks 2:1 OT
12/10: Dundee Tigers - Fife Flyers 3:2
Semifinals
12/24: Dundee Tigers - Kelvingrove 2:1 OT
12/24: Perth Panthers - Falkirk Lions 3:1 
Final
12/31: Perth Panthers - Dundee Tigers 2:1

References 

British